Iker Recio Ortega (born 17 June 2001) is a Spanish footballer who plays for AD Alcorcón B as either a central defender or a left back.

Club career
Born in Escalona, Toledo, Castilla–La Mancha, Recio joined Atlético Madrid's youth setup in 2011, aged ten. On 14 July 2020, after finishing his formation, he joined Rayo Vallecano and was initially assigned to the reserves in Tercera División.

Recio made his senior debut on 18 October 2020, starting in a 3–2 home win against ED Moratalaz. He made his first team debut on 17 December, coming on as a late substitute for Martín Pascual in a 3–2 away win against CD Teruel, for the season's Copa del Rey; three days later he scored his first senior goal, netting for the B's in a 1–3 home loss against CF Pozuelo de Alarcón.

Recio's professional debut occurred on 16 January 2021, as he started in a 2–0 home win against Elche CF, also for the national cup. On 28 June 2022, he left Rayo and signed for another reserve team, AD Alcorcón B in the Segunda Federación.

References

External links

2001 births
Living people
People from Talavera de la Reina
Sportspeople from the Province of Toledo
Spanish footballers
Footballers from Castilla–La Mancha
Association football defenders
Tercera División players
Tercera Federación players
Rayo Vallecano B players
Rayo Vallecano players
AD Alcorcón B players